A city is an incorporated urban municipality in the Canadian province of Manitoba. Under current Manitoba legislation, an urban municipality must have a minimum population of 7,500 to be named a city.

Manitoba has 10 cities, including Flin Flon that is partially located within the neighbouring province of Saskatchewan. These cities had a cumulative population of 892,507 and an average population of 89,251 in the 2021 Census. The province's largest and smallest cities are Winnipeg and the Manitoba portion of Flin Flon with populations of 749,607 and 4,940 respectively. The Manitoba portion of Flin Flon once had a population in excess of 7,500 in 1981 when it had 7,894 residents.

Manitoba's newest and fastest-growing city is Morden, which was incorporated as a city on August 24, 2012.

List 

Notes:

Former cities
Districts of Winnipeg that were incorporated as cities prior to amalgamation on January 1, 1972:
East Kildonan (1957–1972)
St. Boniface (1908–1972)
St. James-Assiniboia (1969–1972)
St. James (1956–1969)
St. Vital (1961–1972)
Transcona (1961–1972)
West Kildonan (1961–1972)

See also 
Amalgamation of Winnipeg
 List of communities in Manitoba
 List of ghost towns in Manitoba
List of municipalities in Manitoba
List of rural municipalities in Manitoba
List of local urban districts in Manitoba
List of towns in Manitoba
List of villages in Manitoba

References 

Cities
Manitoba